Álvaro Vargas Llosa (born 18 March 1966) is a Peruvian-Spanish writer and political commentator and public speaker on international affairs. He is also the writer and presenter of a documentary series for National Geographic Channel on contemporary Latin American history that is being shown around the world. He leads the business advisory committee of the Fundación International para la Libertad (FIL). He was very involved in the struggle for the return of democracy in Peru at the end of the 1990s and the years 2000/1.

Vargas Llosa is the eldest son of writer and Nobel Prize laureate Mario Vargas Llosa (and his father's heir apparent to the Marquisate of Vargas Llosa) and his second wife (and first cousin) Patricia Llosa. He is the brother of UNHCR representative Gonzalo Vargas Llosa and photographer Morgana Vargas Llosa. In 1992, he married Susana Abad, with whom he had a son, Leandro, and a daughter, Aitana. He and his wife are legally separated. He is based in Washington, D.C. but spends a few months a year in Europe, and holds both the Peruvian and Spanish citizenships.

Álvaro Vargas Llosa ia senior fellow at the Independent Institute, who has been a nationally syndicated columnist for the Washington Post Writers Group, and is the author of the book Liberty for Latin America, which obtained the 2005 Antony Fisher International Memorial Award for its contribution to the cause of freedom. He has received numerous awards for his journalistic work as well as for his defense of freedom and liberal democracy under the rule of law. He was appointed Young Global Leader 2007 by the World Economic Forum in Davos. In 2012, Foreign Policy magazine nominated him one of the top 50 public intellectuals in the Spanish-speaking world. In 2021, he was awarded the 'Thomas Jefferson Award' by the Association of Private Enterprise Education (APEE) for his contribution to liberty.

Books

In English 
 Global Crossings: Immigration, Civilization, and America (2013) 
 The Che Guevara Myth and the Future of Liberty (2005) 
 Liberty for Latin America: How to Undo 500 years of State Oppression (2005) 
 Guide to the Perfect Latin American Idiot, with Plinio Apuleyo Mendoza and Carlos Alberto Montaner (1999) 
 Riding the Tiger: Ramiro de León Carpio's Battle for Human Rights in Guatemala with Santiago Aroca. (1995) 
 The Madness of Things Peruvian: Democracy Under Siege (1994)

In Spanish 
  (2012) 
 , with Plinio Apuleyo Mendoza and Carlos Alberto Montaner (2007) 
  (2004) 
  (2003) 
  (2000) 
  (2000) 
  (1999) 
  (1998) 
  (1993) 
  (1991)

Ancestry

References

External links
 Personal website
 IRADE Conference (spanish) (video)
 Liberty for Latin America (video)
 Independent Institute biography page
 No Left Turn – An op-ed by Vargas Llosa on the December 2005 election of President Evo Morales in Bolivia.
 The Killing Machine: Che Guevara, from Communist Firebrand to Capitalist Brand

1966 births
Living people
People from Lima
Peruvian essayists
Peruvian journalists
Peruvian television journalists
Peruvian male writers
Peruvian people of Spanish descent
Spanish people of Peruvian descent
Vargas Llosa family
Carnegie Council for Ethics in International Affairs
Reporters and correspondents